Several special routes of U.S. Route 61 exist in the states of Louisiana, Mississippi, Missouri, and Iowa.

Business routes

Baton Rouge, Louisiana

U.S. Highway 61 Business (US 61 Bus.) runs  through Baton Rouge, the capital city of Louisiana.  The route is entirely concurrent with US 190 Bus., forming a loop off of mainline US 61/US 190 (Airline Highway) through the downtown area.  The business route was first put into effect in 1954 and assumed its current alignment in 1960.

St. Francisville, Louisiana

U.S. Highway 61 Business (US 61 Bus.) ran  through St. Francisville, a town in West Feliciana Parish, Louisiana.  The route followed a portion of former US 61 that was bypassed by the current alignment around 1959.  Like several other special routes in Louisiana, the designation was unofficial, not recognized by AASHTO or printed on the official state highway maps.  It was signed along portions of LA 3057 (Commerce Street) and LA 10 (Jackson Road).  Signage was removed around 2013 when new highway markers were installed following the widening of mainline US 61 to four lanes and a change in several highway designations in the area.

Natchez, Mississippi

US 61 BUS in Natchez, MS uses part of US 425/US 84, then turns onto Homochitto Street. US 61 BUS turns right onto South Martin Luther King Jr. Street. US 61 BUS then turns onto a pair of one way streets concurrent with US 84 BUS (East Franklin Street northbound; Saint Cathrine Street southbound); Mississippi Highway 555 continues northward. The routes then merge into a divided highway before meeting mainline US 61/US 84.

Vicksburg, Mississippi

U.S. Highway 61 Business (US 61 Bus.) is a business route in Vicksburg, Mississippi.

Bowling Green, Missouri

U.S. Route 61 BUS. in Bowling Green, MO is a four mile long business route of US 61. It intersects with US 54 Business in Bowling Green.

New London, Missouri

U.S. 61 Business is a two mile business loop in New London, Missouri.

Palmyra, Missouri

U.S. 61 Business is a four mile business loop in Palmyra, Missouri.

La Grange, Missouri

U.S. 61 Business is a five mile business loop in La Grange, Missouri.

Canton, Missouri

U.S. 61 Business is a five mile business loop in Canton, Missouri.

Keokuk, Iowa

U.S. Route 61 Business (US 61 Business) begins west of Keokuk at the eastern intersection of US 136 and US 61 just north of their crossing into Iowa from Missouri over the Des Moines River.  As it travels into Keokuk, it follows US 136 and the two routes run parallel to the Mississippi River just to the south.  At the southern end of downtown Keokuk, US 136 turns to the southeast to travel across the Keokuk–Hamilton Bridge to Illinois.  This intersection is also the southern end of US 218.  US 61 Business turns north to follow US 218 out of the city.  The two routes meet up with US 61 on the northwestern end of town and the business route ends.

Fort Madison, Iowa

U.S. Route 61 Business was created through Fort Madison, Iowa, along the former routing of US 61.  The main route was rerouted around town along a new four-lane bypass in 2012.  It begins at the interchange with Iowa Highway 2 (Iowa 2) west of Fort Madison.  The two routes run east together into town.  Iowa 2 splits away to cross the river near downtown and the route turns north and heads out of town.  It ends at another interchange with US 61 northeast of town.  From 2011 to 2013, the portion of highway north of Iowa 2 was known officially as Iowa 961, but it was not signed as such.

Muscatine, Iowa

U.S. Highway 61 Business was created in 1984 after U.S. Highway 61 (US 61) was rerouted around Muscatine on a new four-lane bypass.  It begins on the southern edge of Muscatine at the intersection of US 61 and Iowa Highway 92 (Iowa 92).  US 61 Business heads north through Muscatine's industrial area and into the downtown riverfront.  It is joined by Iowa 38 and Iowa 92 at an intersection near the foot of the Norbert F. Beckey Bridge.  The intersection marks the southern end of Iowa 38 while Iowa 92 crosses the bridge into Illinois.  A few blocks later, the three routes are joined by Iowa 22.  All four routes continue north for a mile before meeting US 61.

Davenport, Iowa

U.S. Route 61 Business was created in 2010 when U.S. Route 61 was rerouted around Davenport on I-280 and I-80.  The route begins on the southwestern end of town at the interchange with I-280.  From there, it heads towards the Mississippi River along River Drive.  For six blocks, US 61 Bus. is overlapped by US 67, which joins from the south at the Centennial Bridge and parts to the north when US 61 Bus. turns off.  For the most of the remaining trip through Davenport, the route runs along two one-way streets: Brady Street (northbound) and Harrison Street (southbound).  Near 5th Street in downtown Davenport, the Iowa Interstate Railroad crosses over Brady and Harrison streets.  The vertical clearance of both bridges is only , which causes many trucks that attempt to pass beneath the bridge to hit or become stuck.  This bridge was a major factor in US 61's realignment.  Just south of Kimberly Road, which carries US 6, the southbound lanes of US 61 Bus. turn onto Harrison Street from Welcome Way.  North of 53rd Street, the two directions rejoin as one road.  The route ends at the I-80 interchange on the northern side of town.  The entire route is inventoried as Iowa Highway 461, but it not signed as such.

Maquoketa, Iowa

The business route through Maquoketa follows Main Street through the downtown business district, and Iowa Highway 64 along Platt Street. The route is unsigned, aside from a few circle "City Route 61" signs along Main Street.

Although not designated until 1998, Main Street had essentially served as a "Business 61" since at least the mid-1970s, when U.S. 61 was moved to a two-lane bypass around the south and west parts of the city. The bypass was widened to four-lane freeway in the summer of 1996, as part of a massive four-lane project of U.S. 61 between Dubuque and De Witt.

Bypass route

Baton Rouge, Louisiana

U.S. Highway 61 Bypass (US 61 Byp.) ran  through Baton Rouge, the capital city of Louisiana.  It followed the Airline Highway, a four-lane bypass of the downtown area constructed in 1941.  The designation remained in effect until about 1963, when its route was assumed by mainline US 61.

Spur routes

New Madrid, Missouri

Bowling Green, Missouri

US 61 Spur is an unsigned spur route of US 61 Business in Bowling Green, Missouri. It runs from the Bus. 61/Route Y junction to Route AA (Main Cross Street). This route is also known as Main Street.

References

61
61
61
61
S61
61